The Grammatica de Interlingua, written by Karel Wilgenhof, is the first Interlingua grammar written entirely in Interlingua. The Grammatica does not depart in substance from the principles outlined in the 1951 Interlingua Grammar but presents them in condensed form, allowing the author space for copious examples. Originally published in 1973 by the Union Mundial pro Interlingua (UMI), the popular Grammatica makes observations about the practical use of Interlingua as it has evolved over time.

In his forward to the 1995 revision, the author noted that Interlingua was spoken from Europe and North America to Brazil, India, and Central Africa. He suggested that, as a result, the Grammatica had gained sufficiently in value to merit this expanded and substantially revised reissue.

References

 Wilgenhof, Karel, Grammatica de Interlingua (revised and expanded edition). Union Mundial pro Interlingua, 1995.

1973 non-fiction books
Interlingua publications